Van Dijk is a Dutch toponymic surname meaning "from (the) dike". With 56,441 people, it was the fifth most common name in the Netherlands in 2007. Abroad, people with this surname usually abandoned the ij digraph, resulting in names like Van Dyke and Van Dyk. People with the original surname include:

Dutch people 
 Anouk van Dijk (born 1965), choreographer and dancer
 Ans van Dijk (1905–1948), Nazi collaborator during World War II
 Arjan van Dijk (born 1987), football player
 Bill van Dijk (born 1947), singer
 Bryan van Dijk (born 1981), judoka
 Cilia van Dijk (born 1941), film producer
 Daan van Dijk (1907–1986), track cyclist
 Dick van Dijk (1946–1997), football striker
 Dick van Dijk (born 1970), darts player
 Diederik van Dijk (born 1971), politician
 Dominique van Dijk (born 1979), football midfielder
 Edith van Dijk (born 1973), swimmer
 Ellen van Dijk (born 1987), road and track cyclist
 Frans Van Dijk (1853–1939), Belgian architect
 Gé van Dijk (1923–2005), football player and coach
 Gerrit van Dijk (1938–2012), animator, film maker, and painter
 Gijs van Dijk (born 1980), politician and union leader
 Gregoor van Dijk (born 1981), football midfielder
 Herman K. van Dijk (born 1948), economist
 Jan van Dijk (born 1952), sociologist and communication scientist
 Jan van Dijk (born 1956), football midfielder
 Jappie van Dijk (born 1944), speed skater
 Jasper van Dijk (born 1971), politician
 Joeri van Dijk (born 1983), sailor
 Johannes van Dijk (1868–1938), rower
 Joost van Dijk (died 1632), privateer and first settler of the Virgin Islands
 Kay van Dijk (born 1984), volleyball player
 Kees van Dijk (1931–2008), politician
  (1916–1978), theater and television actor
 Leon van Dijk (born 1992), football player
 Louis van Dijk (1941–2020), pianist
 Marijn van Dijk (born 1979), developmental psychologist and linguist
 Nelis van Dijk (1904–1969), boxer
 Niek van Dijk (born 1951), orthopaedic surgeon
 Otwin van Dijk (born 1975), politician
 Peter van Dijk (born 1952), politician
 Philip van Dijk (1683–1753), painter
 Philip van Dijk (footballer) (1885–1937), midfielder
 Rob van Dijk (born 1969), football goalkeeper
 Rudi Martinus van Dijk (1932–2003), composer
 Ryan van Dijk (born 1990), football midfielder
 Sam van Dijk (born 1996), basketball player
 Sergio van Dijk (born 1982), football player
 Stefan van Dijk (born 1976), racing cyclist
 Steven van Dijk (born 1969), cricket bowler
 Teun A. van Dijk (born 1943), scholar in linguistics
 Virgil van Dijk (born 1991), football player
 Wendy van Dijk (born 1976), actress and television presenter

Other people 
 Anne-Mette van Dijk (born 1968), Danish badminton player
Germaine van Dijk (born 1983), Surinamese football player
 Hilbert Van Dijk (1918–2001), Australian fencer 
 Jace Van Dijk (born 1981), Australian rugby league player
 Jennifer van Dijk-Silos (born 1954), Surinamese Minister of Justice and Police
 Mijk van Dijk (born 1963), German DJ
 Nikki Van Dijk (born 1994), Australian professional surfer
Ruel (born 2002), Australian singer-songwriter

See also 
 Van Dijck
 Van Dyk
 Van Dyke (disambiguation)
 Van Dyck (surname)

References 

Dutch-language surnames
Surnames of Dutch origin
Toponymic surnames

de:Dijk